Robert Nemiroff may refer to: 

Robert B. Nemiroff, American theater producer and ex-husband of Lorraine Hansberry
Robert J. Nemiroff, American astrophysicist
Robert V. Barron (1932–2000), American actor born Robert V. Nemiroff